Peter Bärtschi (born 23 December 1935) is a Swiss former swimmer. He competed in two events at the 1960 Summer Olympics.

References

External links
 

1935 births
Living people
Swiss male freestyle swimmers
Olympic swimmers of Switzerland
Swimmers at the 1960 Summer Olympics
Sportspeople from Basel-Stadt
20th-century Swiss people